Ethyl nitrate is the ethyl ester of nitric acid and has the chemical formula .  It is a colourless, volatile, explosive, and highly flammable liquid. It is used in organic synthesis and as an intermediate in the preparation of some drugs, dyes, and perfumes.

Ethyl nitrate is found in the atmosphere, where it can react with other gases to form smog.  Originally thought to be a pollutant, formed mainly by the combustion of fossil fuels, recent analysis of ocean water samples reveal that in places where cool water rises from the deep, the water is saturated with alkyl nitrates, likely formed by natural processes.

Preparation

Ethyl nitrate has been prepared by bubbling gaseous nitryl fluoride through ethanol at −10 °C. The reaction was subsequently studied in detail.

Ethyl nitrate can be prepared by nitrating ethanol with fuming nitric acid or a mixture of concentrated sulfuric and nitric acids. Further purifying by distillation carries a risk of explosion.

References

Ethyl esters
Alkyl nitrates